Jalan Sungai Temong (Perak state route A11) is a major road in Perak, Malaysia.

List of junctions

Sungai Temong